{{DISPLAYTITLE:C4H16Cl3CoN4}}
The molecular formula C4H16Cl3CoN4 (molar mass: 285.48 g/mol, exact mass: 283.9773 u) may refer to:

 Cis-Dichlorobis(ethylenediamine)cobalt(III)_chloride
 Trans-Dichlorobis(ethylenediamine)cobalt(III)_chloride